Arroyo Seco is a  tributary stream to Schell Creek in southern Sonoma County, California, United States. In Spanish arroyo seco means "dry creek".

Arroyo Seco Creek drains a portion of the western slopes of the southern Mayacamas Mountains. Its  watershed, along with the entire Mayacamas mountain block, was formed in the Miocene era by volcanic action and with tectonic uplift about 12 million years ago.

Soils of the immediate streambed and its vicinity are classified as the riverwash series, recent deposition of sands and gravels.

It flows southward, emerging from near Sonoma Valley Hospital. After a confluence with Haraszthy Creek, it crosses under State Route 12 near Schellville, California, where it flows into Schell Creek. Schell Creek discharges to a network of sloughs that eventually empty into Sonoma Creek, which in turn empties into the Napa Sonoma Marsh and San Pablo Bay.

See also
California oak woodland
List of watercourses in the San Francisco Bay Area
Miwok

References

Rivers of Sonoma County, California
Mayacamas Mountains
Tributaries of Sonoma Creek
Washes of California
Rivers of Northern California